Hamidiyeh District is a district (bakhsh) in Ahvaz County, Khuzestan Province, Iran. At the 2006 census, its population was 48,372, in 8,391 families.  The district has one city: Hamidiyeh. The district has three rural districts (dehestan): Jahad Rural District, Karkheh Rural District, and Tarrah Rural District.

References 

Ahvaz County
Districts of Khuzestan Province